The 2020 West Virginia Democratic presidential primary was held on June 9, 2020 alongside the Georgia primary, as part of the Democratic Party primaries for the 2020 presidential election. It was originally scheduled for May 12, 2020, but was moved to June 9 due to the COVID-19 pandemic. The West Virginia primary was a semi-closed primary, with the state awarding 34 delegates to the 2020 Democratic National Convention, of whom 28 were pledged delegates allocated on the basis of the primary results.

Former vice president and recently determined presumptive nominee Joe Biden swept the state and won all 28 delegates with 65% of the vote, winning all 55 counties.  Senator Bernie Sanders missed the delegate threshold with little more than 12%, a stark reversal from 2016 when he had won all 55 counties, and David Lee Rice, an army veteran and resident of Parkersburg, West Virginia, who did not appear on the ballot in any other state, received 8%.

Procedure
West Virginia was previously scheduled to vote on May 12, 2020, alongside Nebraska, in the Democratic primaries, but on April 1 the primary was rescheduled by governor Jim Justice to June 9, 2020, setting it alongside the equally rescheduled Georgia primary. Voting took place throughout the state from 6:30 a.m. until 7:30 p.m. 

In the semi-closed primary, candidates had to meet a threshold of 15 percent at the congressional district or statewide level in order to be considered viable. The 28 pledged delegates to the 2020 Democratic National Convention were allocated proportionally on the basis of the results of the primary. Of these, between 6 and 7 were allocated to each of the state's 3 congressional districts and another 3 were allocated to party leaders and elected officials (PLEO delegates), in addition to 6 at-large delegates. Originally planned with 24 delegates, the final number included a 20% bonus of 4 additional delegates on the original number of 16 district and 5 at-large delegates by the Democratic National Committee due to the original May date, which belonged to Stage III on the primary timetable.

Following the election of district delegates to the district caucuses and the state convention on June 2, national convention district-level delegates were elected by the district caucuses during the state convention on June 12, 2020, and the 6 at-large and 3 pledged PLEO delegates were elected by the state executive committee the following day, also at the state convention. The delegation also included 6 unpledged PLEO delegates: 5 members of the Democratic National Committee and one senator from Congress.

Candidates 
The following candidates qualified for the ballot in West Virginia:

Running

Joe Biden
David Lee Rice

Withdrawn

Michael Bennet
Michael Bloomberg
Pete Buttigieg
Tulsi Gabbard
Amy Klobuchar
Deval Patrick
Bernie Sanders
Tom Steyer
Elizabeth Warren
Andrew Yang

Results

County results

Analysis 
Four years earlier, Sanders won the West Virginia primary by a wide margin, 51 to 35, against Hillary Clinton. This was considered to be mainly based on a protest vote against Clinton and both her and the Obama administration's coal policies. Many of the traditionally more conservative West Virginia Democrats went on to vote for Donald Trump.

In 2020, the strength Sanders had among traditionally more conservative Democrats, protest vote or not, almost collapsed, with most of the support swinging to Joe Biden. Biden was the presumptive nominee at the time as Sanders had suspended his campaign shortly before, however, Sanders did notably better than in the Kentucky primary a few weeks later, which was another state were more conservative Democrats turned out for him in 2016.

In an indication of the alienation of the West Virginia Democratic Party from the national one, this primary marked the third consecutive time where a candidate only running in the West Virginia Democratic primary received a notable performance, with nationally obscure candidate David Lee Rice receiving 8.3% of the vote.

References

External links
The Green Papers delegate allocation summary
West Virginia Democratic Party draft delegate selection plan

West Virginia Democratic
Democratic primary
2020
West Virginia Democratic primary, 2020